The following is a list of presidents of the entertainment division for the Fox Broadcasting Company (Fox).

References